Semonina is a genus of butterflies in the family Lycaenidae. The species of this genus are found in the Neotropical realm.

Species
Semonina ares (Godman & Salvin, [1887])
Semonina semones (Godman & Salvin, [1887])

External links

Eumaeini
Lycaenidae of South America
Lycaenidae genera